Myrica californica (California bayberry, California wax myrtle or Pacific wax myrtle; syn. Gale californica (Cham. & Schltdl.) Greene, Morella californica (Cham. & Schltdl.) Wilbur) is an evergreen shrub or small tree native to the Pacific Ocean coast of North America from Vancouver Island south to California as far south as the Long Beach area.

It grows to 2–10 m tall, and has serrated, sticky green leaves 4–13 cm long and 0.7–3 cm broad, which emit a spicy scent on warm days. The flower's inflorescence is arranged in a spike 0.6–3 cm long, in range of colors from green to red. The fruit is a wrinkled purple berry 4–6.5 mm diameter, with a waxy coating, hence the common name wax myrtle. This species has root nodules containing nitrogen-fixing microorganisms, allowing it to grow in relatively poor soils.

Cultivation and uses
It grows well on cool, moist coastlines and can be planted in lines as a seaside windbreak. The bark and leaves have historically been used on occasion for gastrointestinal ailments. The most active chemical is apparently the glycoside myricinic acid, which is related to saponin. The plant tissues are also high in tannins. The wax may be extracted from the fruit and made into candles and soap; however, this species produces much less wax than other bayberries, and so is rarely used for this purpose.

Various birds eat the berries in small quantities.

References

External links

Flora of North America: Myrica californica
Jepson Manual treatment of Myrica californica
Myrica californica — UC Photo gallery

californica
Flora of California
Flora of Oregon
Flora of Washington (state)
Flora of the Klamath Mountains
Natural history of the California chaparral and woodlands
Natural history of the California Coast Ranges
Natural history of the San Francisco Bay Area
Natural history of the Santa Monica Mountains
Garden plants of North America
Drought-tolerant plants
Flora of the West Coast of the United States
Shrubs
Plants described in 1831
Flora without expected TNC conservation status